The list of ship launches in 1723 includes a chronological list of some ships launched in 1723.


References

1723
Ship launches